Umm Kulthūm bint ʿUqba was a companion of the Islamic prophet Muhammad. A verse of the Qur'an, 60:10, was declared in response to her situation.

Emigration
Born in Mecca, she was the daughter of Uqba ibn Abu Mu'ayt and Arwa bint Kurayz; hence Caliph Uthman was her uterine half-brother. Their mother Arwa was a first cousin of Muhammad.

Umm Kulthum's father Uqba was an outspoken opponent of Muhammad, but she became a Muslim before 622. She remained in Mecca after the Hijra. Uqba was killed at the Battle of Badr in 624.

After the Treaty of Hudaybiyyah in 628, Umm Kulthum left Mecca for Medina in the company of a man from the Khuza'a tribe. Her brothers, Walid and Ammara, pursued her, and she arrived in Medina only one day ahead of them. Her brothers asked Muhammad to return her to them, in accordance with the treaty, which stated that Muslims who escaped from Mecca to Medina should be returned to their families. Umm Kulthum pleaded that "women are weak" and that she might not have the strength to remain firm in her faith if she had to live among polytheists. Muhammad then announced the new revelation:

After this prophecy, he pointed out that the word in the treaty for "escaped people" was masculine, so it did not apply to women. However, escaped women must be tested for the genuineness of their faith. Umm Kulthum was asked whether she had come to Medina "for love of Allah and his Apostle and Islam" or whether she was seeking or escaping a husband or hoping to make money. After she had passed the test, Muhammad told her brothers: "Allah has broken the treaty regarding women by what you know, so leave."

Other women then followed Umm Kulthum's example and also left Mecca for Medina.

Subsequent career
Four men asked for her hand in marriage, and in fact she was to marry all four of them in rotation. She asked her brother Uthman which suitor she should accept, and he advised her to consult the Prophet himself. He instructed her to marry Zayd ibn Harithah. She bore him two children, of whom Zayd died in infancy, but Ruqayya lived to come under the protection of Uthman. Zayd divorced Umm Kulthum, but was killed soon afterwards at the  battle of Mu'tah.

She then married Zubayr ibn al-Awwam, whom she "disliked" because he had "some harshness towards women." She asked him for a divorce, but he refused. So "she pestered him while he was doing wudu for the prayer, and he divorced her with a single divorce." She then left the room and gave birth to their daughter Zaynab, which immediately ended her 'iddah. When Zubayr heard, he complained, "She tricked me, may Allah trick her!" Muhammad advised him to "propose to her again," but Zubayr replied: "She will never come back to me."

Her third husband was Abd al-Rahman ibn Awf. She bore him six children: Muhammad, Ibrahim, Hamid (or Humayd), Ismail, Hamida and Amat ar-Rahman. This marriage lasted over twenty years, until Abd al-Rahman's death in 653/654.

On being widowed, Umm Kulthum married Amr ibn al-'As, but she died only one month later.

References

610s births
650s deaths
7th-century Arabs
Women companions of the Prophet
Banu Umayya